Mateus Gonçalves Martins (born 28 September 1994), known as Mateus Gonçalves, is a Brazilian professional footballer who plays as a winger for América Mineiro.

External links
 Ceará profile 
 
 

1994 births
Living people
Footballers from Belo Horizonte
Brazilian footballers
Association football wingers
Campeonato Brasileiro Série A players
Sport Club do Recife players
Fluminense FC players
Ceará Sporting Club players
América Futebol Clube (MG) players
Vitória S.C. B players
Liga MX players
Paraguayan Primera División players
C.F. Pachuca players
Chiapas F.C. footballers
Club Atlético Zacatepec players
Deportivo Toluca F.C. players
Club Tijuana footballers
Cerro Porteño players
Brazilian expatriate footballers
Brazilian expatriate sportspeople in Portugal
Brazilian expatriate sportspeople in Mexico
Expatriate footballers in Portugal
Expatriate footballers in Mexico
Expatriate footballers in Paraguay